The Boston Senior Hurling Championship is an annual hurling competition, played in the Boston region of the USA. The competition is organised by the Northeast Division Board of the Gaelic Athletic Association. The final is usually held the weekend prior to Labor Day. The winners and the runners-up will represent Boston in the North American Senior Hurling Championship.

Roll of honour

Senior Championship